Phomopsis caricae-papayae is a fungal plant pathogen infecting papayas.

References

External links
 USDA ARS Fungal Database

Fungal tree pathogens and diseases
Papaya tree diseases
caricae-papayae